The pink-browed rosefinch (Carpodacus rodochroa) is a finch in the family Fringillidae. The species was first described by Nicholas Aylward Vigors in 1831. It ranges across the northern regions of the Indian subcontinent, mainly in the Himalayas, and is migratory.  It is found in Bhutan, Tibet, India, Nepal, and Pakistan. Its natural habitats are boreal forests and subtropical or tropical dry forests.

Gallery

References

pink-browed rosefinch
Birds of Bhutan
Birds of North India
Birds of Nepal
Birds of Tibet
pink-browed rosefinch
Taxonomy articles created by Polbot